Eric Coleman (born 1965) is an American geriatrician and academic. He was a professor at the University of Colorado. His research focuses on improving care transitions. Coleman was awarded a MacArthur Fellowship in 2012.

References

University of Colorado faculty
MacArthur Fellows
Living people
American geriatricians
University of California, Davis alumni
UC Berkeley School of Public Health alumni
University of California, San Francisco alumni
Physicians from Colorado
1965 births